Eugnosta chionochlaena is a species of moth of the family Tortricidae. It is found in Ethiopia.

References

Endemic fauna of Ethiopia
Moths described in 1932
Eugnosta